Mrs. Matthews, Dressmaker is a 1912 American drama film directed by Francis J. Grandon and starring Margarita Fischer in the title role. It was produced by the Independent Moving Pictures Company of New York.

References

External links
 

1912 films
1912 drama films
Silent American drama films
American silent short films
American black-and-white films
1912 short films
Films directed by Francis J. Grandon
1910s American films